Odelmys Palma López (born 18 December 1971 in Havana, Ciudad de la Habana) is a retired javelin thrower from Cuba.

Career

She finished eleventh at the 1996 Summer Olympics. She threw 65.80 metres with the old javelin model in June 1997 in Havana.

Achievements

References
sports-reference

External links

1971 births
Living people
Cuban female javelin throwers
Athletes (track and field) at the 1996 Summer Olympics
Olympic athletes of Cuba
People from Havana